Germaringen is a municipality in the district of Ostallgäu in Bavaria in Germany.

References

Ostallgäu